Wasim Ali can refer to:

 Wasim Ali (Omani cricketer) (born 1998), Omani cricketer
 Wasim Ali (Pakistani cricketer) (born 1969), Pakistani cricketer